The Shellsburg Bridge is a historic structure located in Shellsburg, Iowa, United States. In April 1915 the Benton County Board of Supervisors contracted with Alfred Vinall to build the new bridge near Shellsburg's downtown area. He used a special design by the Iowa State Highway Commission (ISHC), and completed the project in late 1915 for $6,081.06. The ISHC designed plain bridges for its rural spans, but because this span is in town it features decorative elements: bichrome concrete detailing, molded concrete balustrades, and incised spandrel panels. The bridge was listed on the National Register of Historic Places in 1998.

References

Bridges completed in 1915
Transportation buildings and structures in Benton County, Iowa
National Register of Historic Places in Benton County, Iowa
Road bridges on the National Register of Historic Places in Iowa
Arch bridges in Iowa